Gene Pool is an artificial life simulation created by Jeffrey Ventrella in 1997. It features physics-based 2D proto-swimming creatures (swimbots) that compete for mates and food.

Functionality
"Swimming" is not explicitly defined: the ability of locomotion to pursue mates and food emerges through natural selection. Starting from an initial population with randomized genes, a lucky subset of swimbots are able to reach their goals as a function of their morphology and motor control, which are determined by their genes. Those that cannot reach food bits die of hunger and those that cannot reach a mate have no offspring. Within a few generations, localized clusters of swimbots with similar genes emerge and begin spreading throughout the pool. There is no predefined fitness function. The fitness of a swimbot is equated with the number of offspring it has produced in its lifetime.

History
The origins of Gene Pool are based in Ventrella's research using genetic algorithms in real-time computer animation while at the MIT Media Lab in 1994. At Rocket Science Games, Ventrella created the simulation/game Darwin Pond. He acquired the rights to Darwin Pond and published it for free on his website in 1998. GenePool inherited the basic components of Darwin Pond, and introduced some new features, including a sexual selection component (mate preferences for certain colors, shapes and kinds of motion). It was found that mate preference had an effect on evolution of body plans and movement, which was not necessarily beneficial to swimming ability. Research behind these new features was published in artificial life and virtual world conference proceedings.

The software was originally written as a Windows application in C language. Later versions were written in C++, including a version for Mac. A version was later developed for the iPad, but is no longer available for download. In 2020, Gene Pool was published as a web page at swimbots.com. The source code, written in pure vanilla JavaScript/HTML/CSS using the HTML5 canvas, was made available in 2021 for developers to extend its functionality, under the MIT License with the Commons Clause.

GenePool is described in the book, "Artificial Life Models in Software". It is featured in the book "The Story of Life in 10 1/2 Species" by Marianne Taylor, in the final chapter on artificial life. It is also mentioned in "Metacreation - Art and Artificial Life" by Mitchell Whitelaw.

References

External links
Github entry
video: GenePool Evolves
video: Gene Pool - Seeking Coexistence in a Virtual Ecosystem
Gene Pool website
Darwin Pond web site
Tom Barbalet interviews Jeffrey Ventrella and Brian Dodd
Virtual Creature Morphology - A Review
Using Digital Organism Evolutionary Software in the Classroom
Awesome Awesome Evolutionary Software

Artificial life
Science software
Artificial life models
Simulation software